Alcohol detoxification (also known as detox) is the abrupt cessation of alcohol intake in individuals that have alcohol dependence. This process is often coupled with substitution of drugs that have effects similar to the effects of alcohol in order to prevent alcohol withdrawal. When withdrawal does occur, it results in symptoms of varying severity.

As such, the term "detoxification" may be somewhat of a misnomer since the process need not refer exclusively to the removal of toxic substances from the body. Detoxification may or may not be indicated depending upon an individual's age, medical status, and history of alcohol intake. For example, a young man who binge drinks and seeks treatment one week after his last use of alcohol may not require detoxification before beginning treatment for alcohol use disorder.

Withdrawal symptoms
The symptoms of alcohol withdrawal can range from mild to severe depending on the level of alcohol dependence a person has experienced. Symptoms can be behavioural (anxiety, agitation, irritability), neurological (tremor, hallucinations, increased risk of seizures), and physical (changes in heart rate, body temperature, blood pressure, nausea). Symptoms typically occur between 6 and 24 hours since cessation of drinking. In severe cases delirium tremens may occur, which is a medical emergency and could result in death.

Management 
Benzodiazepines are the most common family of drugs used for alcohol detoxification, followed by barbiturates.

Benzodiazepines
Benzodiazepines such as chlordiazepoxide (Librium), diazepam (Valium), lorazepam (Ativan) or oxazepam (Serax) are the most commonly used drugs used to reduce alcohol withdrawal symptoms.  There are several treatment patterns in which it is used.

 The first option takes into consideration the varying degrees of tolerance. In it, a standard dose of the benzodiazepine is given every half-hour until light sedation is reached. Once a baseline dose is determined, the medication is tapered over the ensuing 3 to 10 days. 
 Another option is to give a standard dose of benzodiazepine based on history and adjust based on withdrawal phenomenon
 A third option is to defer treatment until symptoms occur. This method should not be used in patients with prior, alcohol-related seizures. This has been effective in randomized controlled trials. A non-randomized, before and after, observational study found that symptom-triggered therapy was advantageous.

Dosing of the benzodiazepines can be guided by the CIWA scale. The scale is available online.

Regarding the choice of benzodiazepine:
 Chlordiazepoxide (Librium) is the benzodiazepine of choice in uncomplicated alcohol withdrawal due to its long half-life.
 Lorazepam or diazepam is available as an injection for patients who cannot safely take medications by mouth.
 Lorazepam and oxazepam are indicated in patients with impaired liver function because they are metabolised outside of the liver.

Nitrous oxide
Nitrous oxide has been shown to be an effective and safe treatment for alcohol withdrawal. Over 20,000 cases of the alcoholic withdrawal state have been successfully treated with psychotropic analgesic nitrous oxide (PAN) in South Africa and Finland. In 1992 it was officially approved for the treatment of addictive withdrawal states by the medical authorities in South Africa. Consequently, patients receiving it can claim a refund from their medical insurance. The gas therapy reduces the use of highly addictive sedative medications (like benzodiazepines and barbiturates) by over 90%. The technique thus reduces the danger of secondary addiction to benzodiazepines, which can be a real problem amongst alcoholics who have been treated with these agents.

Other
Randomized controlled trials have found benefit from atenolol and clonidine. A randomized controlled trial has found benefit from carbamazepine.
Some hospitals administer alcohol to prevent alcohol withdrawal although there are potential problems with this practice.

Various vitamins, especially from the B group, are often used during alcohol withdrawal treatment.

Sodium oxybate is the sodium salt of gamma-hydroxybutyric acid (GHB).  It is used for both acute alcohol withdrawal and medium-to-long-term detoxification. This drug enhances GABA neurotransmission and reduces glutamate levels.  It is used in Italy in small amounts under the trade name Alcover.

Baclofen has been shown in animal studies and in small human studies to enhance detoxification. This drug acts as a GABA B receptor agonist and this may be beneficial.

Phenibut is used in Eastern Europe for alcohol detoxification as it has sedative and anxiolytic effects.

See also
 Drug detoxification
 Detoxification, the process, real or perceived, of removing toxins from the body.

References

Alcohol and health
Detoxification